Hannes Võrno (born 1 May 1969, Rakvere) is an Estonian comedian and former politician and military officer.

To the general public, Võrno is mainly known as a member of the comedy troupe Kreisiraadio, as well as the co-host of the TV show Kahvel and host of TV shows Kes tahab saada miljonäriks? (franchise of Who Wants to Be a Millionaire?) and Tõehetk (franchise of Moment of Truth).

Politics 
Võrno is a member of the Isamaa ja Res Publica Liit political party. He was a member of Riigikogu, Estonia's parliament, in 2003, but resigned to work as TV host.

References

External links
Riigikogu profile

1969 births
Living people
Estonian comedians
Who Wants to Be a Millionaire?
Members of the Riigikogu, 2003–2007
Isamaa politicians
Conservative People's Party of Estonia politicians
Estonian television personalities
People from Rakvere
Estonian male film actors
Estonian male television actors
Estonian game show hosts
Eurovision Song Contest entrants of 2008
Eurovision Song Contest entrants for Estonia
21st-century Estonian politicians